Kerasea (or Kerasia) is a community located in Aiani municipal unit, Kozani regional unit, in the Greek region of Macedonia. It is situated at an altitude of 540 meters above sea level. The postal code is 50004, while the telephone code is +30 24610. At the 2011 census, the population was 165.

References

Populated places in Kozani (regional unit)